Seven Days of Falling is a studio album by the Swedish group Esbjörn Svensson Trio that was recorded and released in 2003. The album had the unusual distinction charting on both the top jazz and popular music albums charts.

Reception

The recording was praised for its accessibility by The Times, and was The Birmingham Posts Jazz CD of the Week. It received the German Jazz and
Swedish Grammy-award 2004.

Track listing
"Ballad for the Unborn" — 5:32
"Seven Days of Falling" — 6:26
"Mingle in the Mincing-Machine" — 6:52
"Evening in Atlantis" — 0:50
"Did They Ever Tell Cousteau?" — 6:05
"Believe, Beleft, Below" — 4:51
"Elevation of Love" — 6:43
"In My Garage" — 4:18
"Why She Couldn't Come" — 6:30
"O.D.R.I.P." — 14:26

The last track of the CD release – "O.D.R.I.P." – contains a hidden track. The tracks itself ends at 08:19 and after about several minutes of silence the hidden track commences, a vocal rendering of "Believe, Beleft, Below" sung by Josh Haden.

Personnel 
Esbjörn Svensson Trio
Dan Berglund – double bass
Magnus Öström – drums
Esbjörn Svensson – piano
Sven Dolling – art direction
Patrik Sehlstedt – photography

References

External links 

Seven Days of Falling at Allaboutjazz.com

2003 albums
Esbjörn Svensson Trio albums
ACT Music albums